click.to is an application software that integrates with the operating system clipboard to enhance copy and paste operations. It analyzes data stored on the clipboard and offers the user a choice of appropriate paste-destination programs or web pages from a context menu. click.to is a product of Axonic Informationssysteme GmbH, headquartered in Karlsruhe, Germany.

Extensions 
Users and developers may customize functions and add search queries either through an embedded form or by the use of the click.to API.

System requirements 
The following operating systems support click.to:
Apple: 
 Mac OS X v10.6 Snow Leopard
 Mac OS X v10.7 Lion (64-bit)
Microsoft: 
 Windows XP
 Windows Vista (32- and 64-bit)
 Windows 7 (32- and 64-bit)

Competitors 

click.to is similar functionality of "accelerators" that can be installed as a browser extension for Internet Explorer. These also provide a context menu with speed-dial functions but run only within the browser (whereas click.to is fully integrated into the computer's operating system).

References

External links 
 

Freeware